The State Secretariat for Economic Affairs (often termed as SECO) is Switzerland's governmental center of expertise for economic policy, which includes economic development cooperation. 

Together with the Swiss Agency for Development and Cooperation (SDC) and the Peace and Human Rights Division (PHRD) of the Federal Department of Foreign Affairs, it is in charge of implementing Switzerland’s international cooperation.

History 
SECO was created in 1999 by the merger of the then Federal Office of Foreign Economic Affairs and the Federal Office for Economic Development and Employment. It is described at the time as a "superdepartment" for all things related to Economic affairs in Switzerland.

See also 

 Economy of Switzerland

Links 
 Official website

References 

Federal offices of Switzerland